Events from the year 1804 in Russia

Incumbents
 Monarch – Alexander I

Events

Births

 - Aleksey Khomyakov, Russian theologian, philosopher, poet and amateur artist who co-founded the Slavophile movement. (d. 1860)
 - Mikhail Glinka, Russian composer and founder of the Russian nationalist school of classical music. (d. 1857)

Deaths

 
 
 
 Anna Matyushkina, courtier  (b. 1722)

References

1804 in Russia
Years of the 19th century in the Russian Empire